Revere Health is the largest independent multispecialty physician group in Utah and southeastern Nevada, United States.

Description
The company employs 175 physicians and 130 advanced practitioners at over 100 locations throughout Utah, as well as northern Arizona and southeastern Nevada.

History
Founded in Provo in 1960, the company was formerly known as Central Utah Clinic.  However, in the early 2010s it began expanding into northern and southern Utah. With its wider service area it became prudent to change the identity of the company from its regional name. In rebranded itself as Revere Health in July 2015.

In 2012, Revere Health became the first healthcare organization in Utah to be accredited as an accountable care organization.

In 2021 it was revealed that the group was impacted by a phishing attack the lead to the exposure of around 12,000 patients.

References

External links
 

American companies established in 1960
Companies based in Provo, Utah
Health care companies based in Utah
Healthcare in Arizona
Healthcare in Nevada
Healthcare in Utah
1960 establishments in Utah